Gang War is a 1971  criminal comedy film written and directed by  Steno and starring Carlo Giuffré, Pamela Tiffin, Vittorio De Sica, Aldo Fabrizi, Jean-Claude Brialy and Salvo Randone.

Plot 
Don Calogero Bertuccione, a boss of the Italian American mafia, through his right arm Don Cefalù, orders the young mafioso Salvatore Lo Coco, a Sicilian emigrated to the US, to return to his hometown Castropizzi to kill Don Nicola Manzano called "Nicky" who's suspected of being a spy.
Salvatore does not want to, but must obey to avoid mafia revenge on his family. Once he arrives in Italy he looks for someone who can replace him, but without success. After a series of grotesque events he manages to enter Don Manzano's villa where he then finds out that Don Bertuccione and his men have been killed.

Cast 

 Carlo Giuffré as Salvatore Lo Coco
 Pamela Tiffin as Carmela Lo Coco 
 Jean-Claude Brialy as Domenico "Mimì" Gargiulo
 Aldo Fabrizi as Aldo Panzarani
 Salvo Randone as Don Nicola "Nicky" Manzano
 Vittorio De Sica as Lawyer Michele Cannavale 
 Agnès Spaak as Manzano's Lover
 Mario Feliciani as Don Cefalù 
 Mario Brega as Bevilacqua
 Nino Vingelli as Pasquale 
 Enzo Cannavale as The Priest 
 Angela Luce as Domenico's girlfriend
 Nicoletta Elmi as Mary, the daughter of Salvatore and Carmela

References

External links
 
Gang War at Variety Distribution 

1970s crime comedy films
Films directed by Stefano Vanzina
Films scored by Manuel De Sica
Italian crime comedy films
Films about the Sicilian Mafia
1970s Italian-language films
1971 films
1970s Italian films